Vettakkal' is coastal village in Cherthala taluk of Alappuzha district in Kerala, India. Vettakkal is located approximately 5 km west of Cherthala town, and belongs to Pattanakkad Panchayath

References

Villages in Alappuzha district